Diiodohydroxypropane is an antiseptic and disinfectant. It is also known as jothion or iothion.

References

Secondary alcohols
Organoiodides
Halohydrins